This article details the St Helens's rugby league football club's 2020 season.

Fixtures and results 
  

All fixtures are subject to change

Betfred World Club Challenge

Coral Challenge Cup

Regular season

Play Offs Preliminary Semi Final

Betfred Super League Grand Final

League standings

Notes

Player statistics

As of 2020 Super League Grand Final (27 November 2020)

2020 squad
*Announced on 21 November 2019:

2020 transfers

Gains

Losses

References

External links
 Official website
 Online store
 Saints Heritage Society
 Saints Supporters website
 The Entertainers—Independent supporters website
 Original St Helens RLFC Supporters Club
 New St Helens stadium website

St Helens R.F.C. seasons
Super League XXV by club